Abdelkrim Louanchi (born 12 February 2000) is an Algerian footballer who plays for MO Béjaïa in the Algerian Ligue 2.

Career
In 2020, Louanchi was promoted to USM Alger's first team.

On 5 December 2020, Louanchi made his first league appearance against JS Saoura.

References 

2000 births
Living people
Algerian footballers
Association football forwards
USM Alger players
21st-century Algerian people